Pembroke St Michael is the name of an electoral ward in the town of Pembroke, Pembrokeshire, Wales. It covers the east area of the town.

The ward currently elects a county councillor to Pembrokeshire County Council and three town councillors to Pembroke Town Council. Prior to local government reorganisation in 1995, the ward elected two councillors to South Pembrokeshire District Council and an electoral division with the same name covering a slightly larger area elected one county councillor to Dyfed County Council.

According to the 2011 UK Census the population of the ward was 2,408.

A boundary review took place in 2019, where it was noted that the number of eligible voters was 32% above the average for an electoral ward in Pembrokeshire. As a result, it was recommended that part of the ward was transferred to the neighbouring St Mary South ward, reducing the number of electors by 531. These changes came into effect in 2021.

County elections

Dyfed County Council elections

The Pembroke St. Michael electoral division was first contested in the 1989 Dyfed County Council election, following its introduction in 1988. The electoral division consisted of the Hundleton, Pembroke St. Michael and Stackpole wards and the Community of Lamphey. One seat to Dyfed County Council was available.

Pembrokeshire County Council elections
Following re-organization of local government, Dyfed County Council and the district councils were abolished and replaced with Pembrokeshire County Council. The ward boundaries from the South Pembrokeshire District Council were retained, with one seat available to the new county council, which was first contested in the 1995 Pembrokeshire County Council election. As of 2018, six elections have been held for the seat, the most recent in 2017.

Due to the death of the sitting councillor John Allen in July 2007, a by-election was called for the Pembroke St Michael seat. It took place on 20 November 2007, and saw Conservative candidate Aden Brinn narrowly elected as councillor ahead of Liberal Democrat candidate Gareth Jones, with a nine-vote majority.

The initial May 1995 county election was won by Liberal Democrat candidate John Allen, who had previously held the Pembroke St Michael seat on Dyfed County Council aince 1993.

District Council elections

The ward was introduced in 1986 following a boundary re-alignment. and first contested in the 1987 South Pembrokeshire District Council election. Two seats to the South Pembrokeshire District Council were available.

Pembroke St Michael (two seats)

See also
 List of electoral wards in Pembrokeshire

References

Pembrokeshire electoral wards
Pembroke, Pembrokeshire